Environmentally Sensitive Lands (ESL) is a land conservation program in Hernando County, Florida funded by a bond measure approved by voters November 8, 1988. The program is set up to run for 30 years and seeks "To build an East-West corridor across the county linking large conservation tracts of the Withlacoochee State Forest" and "develop a North-South Coastal Corridor that will continue into Citrus County and south into northern Pasco County."

See also
Environmentally Endangered Lands Programs

References

External links
 Land acquisition nomination form
 Hernando County Environmentally Sensitive Lands (ESL) Program

Environment of Florida